This is the discography of Argentine jazz musician Lalo Schifrin.

Albums 
 1957 Spectrum (Epic)  
 1959 Piano Español (Tico) reissued as Lalolé: The Latin Sound of Lalo Schifrin (Roulette)   
 1962 Piano, Strings and Bossa Nova (MGM)  
 1962 Lalo = Brilliance (Roulette)  
 1962 Bossa Nova: New Brazilian Jazz (Audio Fidelity) reissued, 2000 as Brazilian Jazz (Aleph)  
 1963 Samba Para Dos with Bob Brookmeyer (Verve)  
 1963 Between Broadway & Hollywood (MGM)  
 1964 Explorations with Louis Bellson (Roulette)  
 1964 New Fantasy (Verve)  
 1965 Jazz Suite on the Mass Texts with Paul Horn (RCA Victor) 
 1965 Once a Thief and Other Themes (Verve)
 1966 The Dissection and Reconstruction of Music From the Past as Performed By the Inmates of Lalo Schifrin's Demented Ensemble as a Tribute to the Memory of the Marquis De Sade (Decca) – Rereleased (Verve, 1997)
 1967 Music from Mission: Impossible (Dot)
 1968 There's a Whole Lalo Schifrin Goin' On (Dot)
 1968 More Mission: Impossible (Paramount)
 1968 Insensatez (Universal Distribution) – Japanese release
 1970 En Buenos Aires Grabado En Vivo! (RCA Victor) – Argentinian release
 1971 Rock Requiem (Decca)
 1976 Black Widow (CTI)
 1977 Towering Toccata (CTI)
 1978 Gypsies (Tabu)
 1979 No One Home (Tabu)
 1982 Ins and Outs (Palo Alto)
 1988 Cantos Aztecas with Plácido Domingo (Pro Arte)
 1990 Those Fabulous Hollywood Marches with San Diego Symphony Pops Orchestra (Pro-Arte Records)
 1993 Jazz Meets the Symphony with the London Philharmonic Orchestra (Atlantic) – rec. 1992
 1993 Lalo Schifrin: Continuum/Journeys/Voyage (Label X)
 1994 More Jazz Meets the Symphony with the London Philharmonic (Atlantic) – rec. 1993
 1995 Firebird: Jazz Meets the Symphony No. 3 with the London Philharmonic Orchestra (Four Winds)
 1995 Lili'uokalani Symphony with the Vienna Symphony Orchestra, Kamehameha Schools Children's Chorus & Honolulu Opera Chorus  (Urtext Digital Classics)
 1996 Music from Mission: Impossible (Polydor)
 1998 Gillespiana In Cologne (Aleph)
 1998  Che! (music from the film Che!) (Aleph)
 1998 Jazz Mass in Concert (Aleph)
 1998 Metamorphosis: Jazz Meets the Symphony #4 with the London Philharmonic Orchestra (Aleph)
 1999 Mannix (Aleph)
 1999 Latin Jazz Suite (Aleph)
 1999 Lalo Schifrin Conducts Stravinsky, Schifrin and Ravel (Aleph)
 1999 Jazz Goes to Holywood (Aleph)
 2000 Esperanto (Aleph)
 2000 Bullitt (Aleph)
 2000 Intersections: Jazz Meets the Symphony #5 with the WDR Big Band & the WDR Radio Orchestra of Cologne (Aleph)
 2001 Schifrin/Schuller/Shapiro: Piano Trios (Naxos)
 2002 Return of the Marquis deSade (Aleph)
 2002 Casablanca and Other Hollywood Hits with the Rochester Pops Orchestra (Compendia Music Group / Intersound)
 2003 Symphonic Impressions of Oman (Scherzo) Rereleased 2017 (Aleph)
 2005 The Other Side (Audio Fidelity)
 2005 Letters From Argentina (Aleph)
 2005 Kaleidoscope: Jazz Meets the Symphony#6 with the Sydney Symphony Orchestra (Aleph)
 2007 Lalo Schifrin and Friends  (Aleph)
 2008 Mission: Impossible and Other Thrilling Themes (Verve)
 2011 Invocation: Jazz Meets the Symphony No. 7 with the Czech National Symphony Orchestra (Aleph)
 2018 The Early Years (Enlightenment) – four-disc set includes ten albums

Soundtrack albums

Albums featured 

With José Carreras, Plácido Domingo and Luciano Pavarotti
 The Three Tenors in Concert (London, 1990) – arranger
 The Three Tenors in Concert 1994 (Atlantic, 1994) – arranger
 The 3 Tenors - Paris 1998 (Atlantic, 1998) – arranger

With Stan Getz
 Reflections (Verve, 1963) - composer, arranger and conductor
 Children of the World (Columbia, 1979) - composer, piano, arranger and conductor

With Dizzy Gillespie
Gillespiana (Verve, 1960) – composer, piano and arranger
An Electrifying Evening with the Dizzy Gillespie Quintet (Verve, 1961) – piano
Carnegie Hall Concert (Verve, 1961) – piano
A Musical Safari (1961) – piano
Dizzy on the French Riviera (Philips, 1962) – piano, composer and arranger
New Wave (Philips, 1962) – piano, arranger
The New Continent (Limelight, 1962) – piano, composer and arranger
Something Old, Something New (Philips, 1963) – arranger
Dizzy Gillespie and the Double Six of Paris (Philips, 1963) – arranger
Free Ride (Pablo, 1977) – keyboards, composer, arranger and conductor

With Jimmy Smith
 The Cat (Verve, 1964) – conductor and arranger
 The Cat Strikes Again (LaserLight Records, 1980)

With others
 Cannonball Adderley, The Cannonball Adderley Quintet & Orchestra (Capitol, 1970) – composer, conductor and arranger
 Maurice André, Trompettissimo (Erato, 1994) – arranger and conductor
 Count Basie, Back with Basie (Roulette, 1962)
 Louis Bellson, Thunderbird (Impulse!, 1965) – arranger
 Luiz Bonfá, Luiz Bonfa Plays and Sings Bossa Nova (Verve, 1963) – arranger
 Candido Camero, Conga Soul (Roulette, 1962) – piano, composer, arranger
 Eddie Harris, Bossa Nova (Vee-Jay, 1962) – piano, composer, arranger
 Al Hirt, Latin in the Horn (RCA Victor, 1966) – conductor and arranger
 Julia Migenes, Vienna – Julia Migenes / Lalo Schifrin (Erato, 1993) – piano, conductor
 Astor Piazzolla, Two Argentinians in Paris (?, 1955) (BMG, 2005) – piano
 David Shifrin, Shifrin Plays Schifrin (2006, Aleph) – composer and conductor
 Sarah Vaughan, Sweet 'n' Sassy (1963 Roulette Records)
 Cal Tjader, Several Shades of Jade (Verve, 1963)

Film scores 

Feature films, documentaries, and short subjects for which Schifrin provided original music. These include films for which he composed the entire score, and others for which he composed the theme or other partial contributions

1957: Venga a bailar el rock
1958: The Boss
1964: Joy House
1964: Rhino!
1964: See How They Run (TV movie)
1965: Dark Intruder
1965: Once a Thief
1965: The Liquidator
1966: Blindfold
1966: I Deal in Danger
1966: Murderers' Row
1966: The Doomsday Flight (TV movie)
1966: The Making of a President: 1964 (TV documentary)
1966: Way...Way Out
1967: Cool Hand Luke
1967: How I Spent My Summer Vacation (TV movie)
1967: Sullivan's Empire (TV movie)
1967: The Fox
1967: The President's Analyst
1967: The Venetian Affair
1967: Who's Minding the Mint?
1968: Braddock (TV movie)
1968: Bullitt
1968: Coogan's Bluff
1968: Hell in the Pacific
1968: Sol Madrid
1968: The Brotherhood
1968: The Rise and Fall of the Third Reich (TV documentary)
1968: Where Angels Go, Trouble Follows
1969: Che!
1969: Eye of the Cat
1969: The Reivers (Rejected score)
1969: Mission Impossible Versus the Mob
1970: I Love My Wife
1970: Imago
1970: Kelly's Heroes
1970: Pussycat, Pussycat, I Love You
1970: The Aquarians (TV movie)
1970: The Mask of Sheba (TV movie)
1970: WUSA
1971: Dirty Harry
1971: Escape (TV movie)
1971: Mrs. Pollifax-Spy
1971: Pretty Maids All in a Row
1971: The Beguiled
1971: The Christian Licorice Store
1971: The Hellstrom Chronicle
1971: THX 1138
1972: Joe Kidd
1972: Prime Cut
1972: Rage
1972: The Wrath of God
1972: Welcome Home, Johnny Bristol (TV movie)
1973: Charley Varrick
1973: Egan (TV movie)
1973: Enter the Dragon
1973: Harry in Your Pocket
1973: Hit!
1973: Hunter (TV movie)
1973: Magnum Force
1973: The Neptune Factor
1974: Golden Needles
1974: Man on a Swing
1974: Night Games (TV movie)
1974: The Four Musketeers
1974: Up from the Ape (documentary)
1975: Delancey Street: The Crisis Within (TV movie)
1975: Foster and Laurie (TV movie)
1975: Guilty or Innocent: The Sam Sheppard Murder Case (TV movie)
1975: The Master Gunfighter
1976: Brenda Starr (TV movie)
1976: Sky Riders
1976: Special Delivery
1976: St. Ives
1976: The Eagle Has Landed
1976: Voyage of the Damned
1977: Day of the Animals
1977: Good Against Evil (TV movie)
1977: Rollercoaster
1977: Telefon
1978: Nunzio
1978: Return from Witch Mountain
1978: The Cat from Outer Space
1978: The Manitou
1978: The Nativity (TV movie)
1978: The President's Mistress (TV movie)
1979: Boulevard Nights
1979: Escape to Athena
1979: Institute for Revenge (TV movie)
1979: Love and Bullets
1979: The Amityville Horror
1979: The Concorde ... Airport '79
1980: Brubaker
1980: Serial
1980: The Big Brawl
1980: The Competition
1980: The Nude Bomb
1980: When Time Ran Out
1981: Buddy Buddy
1981: Caveman
1981: La pelle
1981: Loophole
1981: The Fridays of Eternity
1982: A Stranger Is Watching
1982: Amityville II: The Possession
1982: Class of 1984
1982: Falcon's Gold (TV movie)
1982: Jinxed! (1982) (Rejected score) 
1982: Fast-Walking
1982: The Seduction
1982: Victims (TV movie)
1982: Wait Until Dark (TV movie)
1983: Doctor Detroit
1983: Princess Daisy (TV movie)
1983: Rita Hayworth: The Love Goddess (TV movie)
1983: Starflight: The Plane That Couldn't Land (TV movie)
1983: Sudden Impact
1983: The Osterman Weekend
1983: The Sting II
1984: Tank
1985: Bad Medicine
1985: Bridge Across Time (TV movie)
1985: Hollywood Wives (TV movie)
1985: Command 5 (TV movie)
1985: Private Sessions (TV movie)
1985: The Mean Season
1985: The New Kids
1985: A.D. (TV movie)
1986: Beverly Hills Madam (TV movie)
1986: Black Moon Rising
1986: Kung Fu: The Movie (TV movie)
1986: The Ladies Club
1986: Triplecross (TV movie)
1987: Out on a Limb (TV movie)
1987: The Fourth Protocol
1988: Berlín Blues
1988: Shakedown on the Sunset Strip (TV movie)
1988: The Dead Pool
1988: Earth Star Voyager (TV mini series)
1989: Original Sin (TV movie)
1989: Return from the River Kwai
1989: The Neon Empire (TV movie)
1990: Face to Face (TV movie)
1991: F/X2
1993: The Beverly Hillbillies
1993: Danger Theatre (TV series)
1995: Manhattan Merengue!
1996: Scorpion Spring
1997: Money Talks
1998: Rush Hour
1998: Something to Believe In
1998: Tango
2001: Culture Clash: West Meets East (video documentary short)
2001: Jackie Chan's Hong Kong Tour (video documentary short)
2001: Longshot
2001: Rush Hour 2
2002: Tom the Cat (short)
2003: Bringing Down the House
2004: After the Sunset
2004: Biyik (short)
2004: The Bridge of San Luis Rey
2006: Abominable
2007: Rush Hour 3
2007: Ultrasordine (short)
2008: Autour de 'Rush Hour 3' en 80 mots (video documentary)
2009: Mission Impossible (short)
2011: No Rest for the Wicked: A Basil & Moebius Adventure (short)
2011: Love Story
2013: Sweetwater
2015: Tales of Halloween (main title composer)

Television scores

References 

Discographies of Argentine artists
Jazz discographies